The Ministry of Economy and Finance is a ministry of the Government of Haiti. This ministry is responsible for Economy and Finance
along with providing support to the Prime Minister.

See also
 List of Finance Ministers of Haiti

Government ministries of Haiti
Haiti